The Count of Castres was a title in the French nobility.

It was held by:
 John I, Count of La Marche
 Bernard d'Armagnac, Count of Pardiac
 Alan of Albret (1440–1522)
 Boffille de Juge
 Philip de Montfort
 Frederick (970-6 January 1022), Count of Verdun, son of Godfrey I the Prisoner

References